The Martinsville Manufacturers were a Bi-State League baseball team based in Martinsville, Virginia, United States that played from 1934 to 1941. They were affiliated with the St. Louis Cardinals from 1936 to 1939 Philadelphia Phillies from 1940 to 1941. They won one league championship, in 1940 under manager Harry Daughtry.

References

Baseball teams established in 1934
Baseball teams disestablished in 1941
Defunct minor league baseball teams
Martinsville, Virginia
Defunct baseball teams in Virginia
Philadelphia Phillies minor league affiliates
St. Louis Cardinals minor league affiliates
1934 establishments in Virginia
1941 disestablishments in Virginia
Bi-State League teams